The 1996 Princeton Tigers football team was an American football team that represented Princeton University during the 1996 NCAA Division I-AA football season. In its final year at Palmer Stadium, Princeton tied for second-to-last in the Ivy League.

In their 10th year under head coach Steve Tosches, the Tigers compiled a 3–7 record and were outscored 202 to 144. Jimmy Archie and Marc Washington were the team captains.

Princeton's 2–5 conference record tied for sixth place in the Ivy League standings. The Tigers were outscored 142 to 87 by Ivy League opponents. 

Princeton played its home games, for the 183rd and final year, at Palmer Stadium on the university campus in Princeton, New Jersey. After the 1996 season, Palmer Stadium was demolished to make way for its replacement.

Schedule

References

Princeton
Princeton Tigers football seasons
Princeton Tigers football